Gwenaël Renaud (born October 4, 1983, in Vénissieux) is a French professional football player. Currently, he plays in the Championnat de France amateur for Balma SC.

He played on the professional level in Ligue 2 for ASOA Valence.

1983 births
Living people
French footballers
Ligue 2 players
ASOA Valence players
Balma SC players
Association football defenders
People from Vénissieux
Sportspeople from Lyon Metropolis
Footballers from Auvergne-Rhône-Alpes